Sykes is a British sitcom that aired on BBC 1 from 1972 to 1979. Starring Eric Sykes and Hattie Jacques, it was written by Sykes, who had previously starred with Jacques in Sykes and a... (1960–1965) and Sykes and a Big, Big Show (1971). Forty-three of the 1970s colour episodes were remakes of scripts for the 1960s black and white series, such as "Bus" based on 'Sykes and a Following' from 1964 and the episode "Stranger" with Peter Sellers based on 'Sykes and a Stranger' from 1961.

Sykes had the same premise as Sykes and a... with Sykes, Jacques, Richard Wattis and Deryck Guyler reprising their former identical roles. The series was brought to an end by the death of Hattie Jacques of a heart attack on 6 October 1980.

Cast
Eric Sykes – Himself
Hattie Jacques – Harriet (Hat) Sykes
Richard Wattis – Charles Fulbright-Brown (series 1–3)
Deryck Guyler – PC Corky Turnbull
Joy Harington – Melody Rumbelow
Joan Sims – Madge Kettlewell

Plot
With the same premise as Sykes and a..., unmarried twins Eric and Harriet (Hat) Sykes are now living at an end of terrace house, 28 Sebastopol Terrace, East Acton, two doors down from their house in the previous programme. As before, Eric is childish and accident-prone while Hattie is patient. Their neighbour is the snobbish unmarried Charles Fulbright-Brown, and PC Corky Turnbull is the local policeman. Corky's wife, Elsie, is unseen, except for two episodes, Caravan, in which she appears with her face covered in porridge during a food fight between Corky and Eric, and 'Holiday Camp' when the back of her head is shown going into the Ghost Train ride, and later on asleep and passing wind in bed. Deryck Guyler also played Corky's brother Wilfred Turnbull, a train attendant on the Glasgow to London sleeper train, in the episode Journey. He also played another relative bus Inspector Norman Burnside in Bus.

Following the death of Richard Wattis in 1975 a new neighbour, Melody Rumbelow, moves in. The local baker is the widowed Madge Kettlewell (Joan Sims), who appears occasionally, and who fancies Eric – she is first seen in the episode Football. Eric and Hattie are also the owners of a cuckoo clock, naming the very temperamental bird inside Peter. Both speak to it as if it were a real bird, and a great deal of comedy derives from the antagonistic and sarcastic 'conversations' between Eric and Peter.

Episodes

Series one (1972)
"Burglary" (14 September 1972)
"Uncle" (21 September 1972)
"Walk" (28 September 1972)
"Menace" (5 October 1972)
"Boat" (12 October 1972)
"Stranger" (19 October 1972)
"Football" (26 October 1972)
"Job" (2 November 1972)
"Ankle" (9 November 1972)
"Mouse" (16 November 1972)
"Dream" (23 November 1972)
"Marriage" (30 November 1972)
"Cat" (7 December 1972)
"Journey" (14 December 1972) (This episode only exists as a b/w telerecording). Deryck Guyler plays the part of the Sleeping Berth Attendant, and names himself as Wilfrid Turnbull and says he is Corky's twin brother.
"Lodger" (21 December 1972)
"Cafe" (28 December 1972)

Series two (1973)
"An Engagement" (10 September 1973)
"Bus" (17 September 1973); Deryck Guyler also played the bus inspector Burnside who Corky says is his cousin.
"Spy Ring" (24 September 1973)
"Golf" (1 October 1973)
"Rolls" (8 October 1973)
"Peeping Tom" (15 October 1973)
"Fancy Dress" (22 October 1973)
"Window Smasher" (29 October 1973)
"Gamble" (5 November 1973)
"Uniform" (12 November 1973)
"Bird" (19 November 1973)
"Protest" (26 November 1973)
"Salesman" (3 December 1973)
"Haunting" (10 December 1973)
"Nest Egg" (17 December 1973)

Series three (1974)
"The Stolen Bentley" (17 October 1974)
"Holiday in Bogsea" (24 October 1974)
"The Pub" (31 October 1974)
"The Band" (7 November 1974)
"Two Birthdays" (14 November 1974)
"A Bandage" (21 November 1974)
"Log Cabin" (28 November 1974)
"The Fog" (5 December 1974)

Series four (1975)
"Commercial" (24 October 1975)
"Ski-ing" (31 October 1975)
"Caravan" (7 November 1975)
"Reporter" (14 November 1975)
"Marriage" (28 November 1975)
"Night Out" (5 December 1975)
"Christmas Party" (12 December 1975)

Series five (1976)
"Home Movies" (11 November 1976)
"Fishing" (18 November 1976)
"Lodgers" (25 November 1976)
"Holiday Camp" (2 December 1976)
"Inventions" (9 December 1976)
"Flashback" (16 December 1976)
"Squatters" (23 December 1976)
"Bath" (30 December 1976)

Christmas special (1977)
"Sykes at Christmas" (22 December 1977)

Series six (1978)
"The Hypnotist" (4 January 1978)
"Picket Line" (11 January 1978)
"Football Match" (18 January 1978)
"Decorating" (25 January 1978)
"End of the World" (1 February 1978)
"Television Film" (8 February 1978)

Series seven (1979)
"The Drop Out" (5 October 1979)
"Fanny-By-Gaslight" (12 October 1979)
"The Stay-At-Home Holiday" (19 October 1979)
"Bad Medicine" (26 October 1979)
"The Insurance Money" (2 November 1979)
"Six Million Dollar Sykes" (9 November 1979)
"The BBC Honours Sykes" (16 November 1979)

DVD releases
The first series of Sykes was released on DVD in the UK (Region 2) in 2004. Several episodes in this set were reassembled from the original studio sessions rather than the broadcast masters. This not only yielded better quality, but also allowed scenes that had been cut for timing purposes to be restored, and for outtakes to be included as extras. Conversely, since the colour videotape of the episode "Journey" had been wiped this episode was taken from a black and white copy. A brief featurette explains some of the restoration techniques employed.

A Complete Series DVD set (containing all 68 episodes) was released on 26 June 2017. Series 1 is represented by the remastered episodes and featurettes from the previous set. The rest of the episodes do not exhibit the same level of remastering, although some of them do appear to be extended versions.

References
Specific

General
Sykes at British TV Comedy

External links

1972 British television series debuts
1979 British television series endings
1970s British sitcoms
BBC television sitcoms
English-language television shows
Television shows set in London